Georg Olsen (born 5 May 1937) is a Danish long-distance runner. He competed in the marathon at the 1968 Summer Olympics.

References

1937 births
Living people
Athletes (track and field) at the 1968 Summer Olympics
Danish male long-distance runners
Danish male marathon runners
Olympic athletes of Denmark
Athletes from Copenhagen